Klaus Wennemann (18 December 1940 – 7 January 2000) was a German television and film actor.

Wenneman was born in Oer-Erkenschwick, North Rhine-Westphalia. He is perhaps best known for his leading roles as the Chief Engineer, (the LI), in Das Boot, and as Faber in the TV series Der Fahnder. As an actor, he appeared in nine movies, and ten television series. He died in Bad Aibling, Bavaria, at the age of 59, from lung cancer. He was married to the same woman from 1963 until his death; they had two sons together.

Wennemann was good friends with fellow actor Jürgen Prochnow. Their real-life friendship further added to the on-screen friendship of their respective character roles, portrayed in the film Das Boot.

Filmography

External links 
 
 https://www.findagrave.com/memorial/22539863

1940 births
2000 deaths
German male television actors
German male film actors
20th-century German male actors
Deaths from lung cancer
People from Recklinghausen (district)